Matrilins are proteoglycan-associated proteins that are major components of extracellular matrix of various tissues. They include:
 Matrilin-1
 Matrilin-2
 Matrilin-3
 Matrilin-4

Extracellular matrix proteins